Andrew Langtree is a British stage and screen actor known for his roles in Coronation Street and Cutting It.

Life and career
In 1998, Langtree graduated amongst the first alumni of Sir Paul McCartney's Liverpool Institute for Performing Arts (LIPA). Prior to this, he attended De La Salle School, St Helens. Subsequent to graduation, he played Nick Piazza in the West End musical production of Fame at the Prince of Wales Theatre. He then originated the leading role of Sky in the original London stage cast of the ABBA musical Mamma Mia! alongside fellow LIPA alumni Lisa Stokke.

His theatre credits include roles at the Citizens' Theatre, Glasgow, the National Theatre, London and extensive work at the Royal Exchange Theatre, Manchester.

Television appearances include roles in Heartbeat, Holby City, and Cutting It. He played Leon on the ITV soap opera, Coronation Street in 2009 and Justin Gallagher in Emmerdale in 2010. In 2011 Langtree created the role of Carl Bruner in the original West End production of Ghost. After a world premiere run in Manchester, it opened at the Piccadilly Theatre, London on 19 July 2011, and closed 6 October 2012.

Recent roles include, George in Of Mice and Men at the Octagon Theatre, Bolton, under the direction of David Thacker. 'Herring' in Sherlock Holmes - The Best Kept Secret, a new play written by Mark Catley and directed by Nikolai Foster for the West Yorkshire Playhouse, Leeds.

Langtree also acted as 'Monroe Riley' alongside Tim Pigott-Smith in A Stroke of Luck, a new play written by Larry Belling which  premiered at the Park Theatre, Finsbury Park, on 29 January 2014. He performed in Dekker's The Shoemaker's Holiday and also in the world premier of new play Oppenheimer by Tom Morton-Smith both at the Royal Shakespeare Company in Stratford-upon-Avon.

From July to September 2016, he originated the role of Ned Ryerson in the pre-Broadway tryout of the new musical Groundhog Day at The Old Vic, London, directed by Matthew Warchus. Langtree received a nomination for Best Actor in a Supporting Role in a Musical in the 2017 Laurence Olivier Awards.

He played Blind Pew / Smollet in the Birmingham Repertory Theatre's Christmas 2016 production of Treasure Island, directed by Phillip Breen. He later appeared in Breen's production of Richard Bean's new play The Hypocrite at the Hull Truck Theatre and RSC in spring 2017. In May 2021, he appeared in an episode of the BBC soap opera Doctors as Patrick Barclay.

References

External links
 

English male musical theatre actors
English male soap opera actors
English male singers
Living people
Alumni of the Liverpool Institute for Performing Arts
Year of birth missing (living people)